Gjøran Tefre (born 25 November 1994) is a Norwegian cross-country skier.

He made his World Cup debut in December 2015 in Lillehammer, collecting his first World Cup points in his next World Cup outing, which came as late as March 2018, when he finished 14th in the Lahti sprint. He improved slightly to a 13th place in November 2018 in Lillehammer, and repeated his 14th place in January 2019 in Dresden, both in sprint races.

He represents the sports club Førde IL.

Cross-country skiing results
All results are sourced from the International Ski Federation (FIS).

World Cup

Season standings

Team podiums
1 podium – (1 )

References

1994 births
Living people
People from Førde
Norwegian male cross-country skiers
Sportspeople from Vestland